The Battle of Roslin on 24 February 1303 was a Scottish victory in the First War of Scottish Independence. It took place near the village of Roslin, where a force led by the Scots John Comyn and Sir Simon Fraser ambushed and defeated an English reconnaissance party under Lord John Segrave.

Background

An Anglo-Scottish truce expired on 30 November 1302, and the English prepared for a fresh invasion of Scotland, with John Segrave as the king's lieutenant in Scotland. King Edward I ordered Segrave to carry out a large-scale reconnaissance as far as Kirkintilloch, before the king himself fought a larger campaign. This force assembled at Wark on Tweed and moved north.

The battle

The English advanced in three divisions, harassed by the Scots. At night, they camped in three divisions, several miles apart. The two commanders, John Comyn and Simon Fraser, led a Scots force on a night march, fell on the English, capturing Segrave and several others. Robert Neville led his division towards the action. The English eventually freed Segrave, but the English paymaster Manton was killed.

Later legend

Scottish historian John of Fordun wrote a description of the fight:

The battle was the subject of a fictional account written by Walter Bower in the mid-15th century. Like Fordun, Bower seriously exaggerated the size and importance of what was really a victory over a large-scale raid rather than an invading army. The distorted impression of Roslin has lingered in the public imagination to this day.

A monument cairn erected by the Roslin Heritage Society at the end of the 20th century marks the site of the battle. At the start of the 21st century, the battlefield was under research to be inventoried and protected by Historic Scotland under the Scottish Historical Environment Policy of 2009.

References

Further reading
 Historic Scotland entry in its Inventory of Historic battlefields
 Roslin 1303: Scotland’s forgotten battle, Scotsman article, 24 February 2017
 Scottish Battlefields, (tempus/History Press), 2006 
 A.D.M. Barrell, Medieval Scotland, (Cambridge University Press)
 Peter Traquair Freedom's Sword, (HarperCollins 1998) 
 Michael Brown, The Wars of Scotland, 1214–1371 (Edinburgh, 2004)
 David Santiuste, The Hammer of the Scots: Edward I and the Scottish Wars of Independence (Barnsley, 2015)

External links
 
 Scotsman article describing battle https://www.scotsman.com/news-2-15012/roslin-1303-scotland-s-forgotten-battle-1-4375767

Battles of the Wars of Scottish Independence
Conflicts in 1303
1303 in Scotland
History of Midlothian
Battles between England and Scotland